Kamchybek Kydyrshaevich Tashiev (born 27 September 1968) is a Kyrgyzstani politician who was head of the political party Ata-Zhurt until its merger with the Respublika party in 2014. He is currently Chairman of the State Committee for National Security.

Early life and education 
He was born on 27 September 1968 in Barpy, a village in the Kirghiz SSR (a republic of the Soviet Union). From 1987 to 1989 he served in the Soviet Army. In 1992, Tashiev graduated from Tomsk State University with a degree in chemical engineering. In 1999 he graduated from Kyrgyz National University with a degree in law.

Political career 
Following his party's success in the 2010 Kyrgyz parliamentary election, on 23 October, Tashiev's home was burgled. He later stated to Al Jazeera that "they broke in like bandits... I think they intended to shoot me. I believe they tried to eliminate me - the forces that want to cancel election results and impose a state of emergency. I know for sure, GSNB [security services] was behind these actions."

In government 
In 2007, he was appointed Minister of Emergency Situations. In 2009, he resigned due to disagreements with Prime Minister Daniyar Usenov. From 2010 to 2013 he was a deputy of the Jogorku Kenesh. On 16 October 2020 he was appointed chairman of the State Committee for National Security.

Personal life 
He is a citizen of Kyrgyzstan and father of five children. He holds the rank of Lieutenant general. He speaks Kyrgyz and Russian.

References

External link

1968 births
Kyrgyzstani politicians
Living people
Government ministers of Kyrgyzstan
Tomsk State University alumni
Kyrgyz National University alumni